Lee Harrison is an English footballer.

Lee Harrison may also refer to:

Lee Harrison III
Lee Harrison (rugby union)

See also
Leigh Harrison (disambiguation)
Liam Harrison (disambiguation)